When the Circus Comes to Town is the 19th album by Scottish folk musician Bert Jansch released in 1995. The song "Born and Bred in Old Ireland" was also recorded during these sessions but omitted from the UK album. Bert's manager intended to add it to a projected Japanese version of the album, which may or may not have happened. The track was re-recorded for Jansch's 1998 studio album, Toy Balloon

Track listing
All tracks composed by Bert Jansch; except where indicated

"Walk Quietly By"
"Open Road"
"Back Home"
"No-One Around" (Janie Romer)
"Step Back"
"When The Circus Comes To Town"
"Summer Heat"
"Just a Dream"
"The Lady Doctor from Ashington"
"Stealing the Night Away"
"Honey Don't You Understand"
"Born with the Blues"
"Morning Brings Peace Of Mind"
"Living in the Shadows"

Personnel
Bert Jansch - guitar, vocals
Colin Gibson - bass
Liam Genockey - drums
Mike Piggott - violin
Mark Ramsden - soprano saxophone
Bobby Barton - slide guitar
Tony Hinnigan - strings
Maggie Boyle, Janie Romer and Christine Collister - backing vocals

References

Bert Jansch albums
1995 albums
Cooking Vinyl albums